RNA-binding protein 28 is a protein that in humans is encoded by the RBM28 gene. It is a nucleolar component of the spliceosomal ribonucleoprotein complexes.

References

Further reading